Oxynoemacheilus argyrogramma, the two-spot loach is a species of ray-finned fish in the genus Oxynoemacheilus. This species is found in the drainage of the Queiq River in Syria and Turkey, and the upper Euphrates drainage in Turkey and possibly in this drainage in Syria and Iraq. It has almost been extirpated from the Queiq as this river has virtually dried out but it remains abundant in the Euphrates. This species can be found in a wide range of habitats as long as there is a moderately fast current from small upland streams to banks of large rivers. It can also occur in stagnant water bodies such as reservoirs. It is threatened by water abstraction, lowering rainfall due to climate change and the construction of dams. The economic development of the area where this species occurs exacerbates these threats. Freyhof and Özuluǧ published a paper in 2017 that argued that Oxynoemacheilus euphraticus was a valid species and not a synonym of O. argyrogramma.

Footnotes 
 

argyrogramma
Taxa named by Johann Jakob Heckel
Fish described in 1848